is the twelfth-century Japanese tale of one who defies social convention and breaches the decorum expected of a Heian court lady. It is one of ten short stories in the collection Tsutsumi Chūnagon Monogatari.

Story
The protagonist befriends insects, names her attendants after them, and engages in poetic exchanges involving furry caterpillars, leading to laughter on the part of others. Portrayed as even more eccentric is her disregard for her physical appearance: she leaves her hair untrimmed; has unplucked eyebrows; neglects to blacken her teeth; and allows herself to be seen by men. 'Oh, how regrettable! Why does she have such a weird mind'. When an incipient love affair comes to an end along with the tale it is of little surprise to any of the observers.

Interpretation
Donald Keene has suggested that, while the reader may be attracted by her independence of mind, the author was probably trying to satirize those with eccentric behaviour and unconventional tastes. Robert Backus argues that the modern reader may prefer her independence and naturalness to the "excessive artificiality of the Heian conception of feminine beauty". Michele Marra also refers to Fujiwara Munesuke, again links the tale with setsuwa that similarly challenge court orthodoxy, and suggests that the story may see Buddhist truth preferred to the values of the Fujiwara aristocracy at the end of the Heian period.

See also
Setsuwa
The Pillow Book
The Tale of Genji
Geisha (appearance)
Nausicaä of the Valley of the Wind

References

External links
 Text in translation by Backus
 Original Text (In Japanese)

Japanese short stories
Japanese aesthetics
Entomological literature
Monogatari
12th-century Japanese literature
Heian period in literature
Insects in culture
Fiction about insects